Robert Lyn Nelson (born 1955) is an American artist known for his paintings of marine wildlife, particularly those in his "Two Worlds" style, which simultaneously shows life above and below the surface of the sea.

Early life

A native of San Bernardino County, California Nelson began creating murals, sculptures, landscapes, seascapes, and experimenting with still life early in his life. When he was 15, his ninth grade history teacher, David Radcliff, recognizing Nelson's talent, gave him a permanent library pass and allowed him to do independent study. He was to focus on the art of the period of history the class was studying and make sketches - Greek and Roman artwork and notes on the specific art created during that period. In addition Nelson (Bob, as he was then known), did his own independent library work where he discovered Johan Berthold Jongkind and copied Jongkind's famous Windmills of Rotterdam. He also executed a series of Rembrandt van Rijn portraits. Nelson completed that study successfully, something no other student in Radcliff's more than three decades of teaching was ever able to do.

He attended Chaffey High School in Ontario, California and won a scholarship to attend classes at Chaffey College at age thirteen. As a teenager he began exhibiting his paintings (his first show sold out) at a series of one-man shows and group shows in Southern California.

Nelson completed four years of art training at Chaffey College and Mt. San Antonio College, he was offered a full scholarship to continue his studies at the San Francisco Academy of Arts.

Artistic career
Nelson moved to Hawaii when he was eighteen years old. According to Nelson, the turning point in his life and his career occurred when he encountered a group of whales while surfing off Lahaina, Hawaii. "In learning to ride the waves, I also learned to respect the ocean...to feel its pulse with all five of my senses, and to feel its spirit at an extra-sensory level. It was a blend of magic and realism that I wanted to communicate in my paintings," says Nelson. Inspired by this "overwhelming experience", he came up with the idea of painting above- and below-water scenes on the same canvas. It was there that he began painting Hawaiian landscapes and seascapes. When he was twenty-two years old, he moved from Oahu to Maui. He spent a great deal of time surfing, kayaking and scuba diving in Maui, while continuing to paint and study the landscape of the Hawaiian Islands.

Nelson grew a business around his art, Robert Lyn Nelson Studios, which was worth $5 million by the mid-1990s. He used commercial advertising in print, on radio and television to promote his paintings.

Nelson's painting From Sea to Shining Sea was exhibited at the U.S. Pavilion at the 1998 World Expo in Lisbon, Portugal. From March to October 2001, the work was displayed at the Smithsonian Institution's National Museum of Natural History in a solo exhibition along with several of his other paintings. A nationwide tour sponsored by the National Marine Sanctuary System took place following this exhibition.

He has produced and donated paintings to the National Oceanic and Atmospheric Administration. His painting Rainforests of the Sea was reproduced as the poster for the International Year of the Reef in 1997. That same year he was one of four Hawaiians to receive NOAA's Local Environmental Hero award.

Style
The creator of "Two Worlds Environmental Surrealist School of Painting," where the viewer sees simultaneously what is above and below the ocean's surface - a new school of fine art. Seeing a group of whales while surfing off the coast of Lahaina, Maui, inspired him to develop the "Two World" concept. He is best known for his marine painting, however, and he has created more than 9,000 original works of art in a range of styles and techniques.

His first painting in the Two Worlds Environmental style, was created in 1979 and is called Two Worlds. According to Nelson, "It is a visionary fantasy - more surrealism than realism." In this work he has "selectively shown some of Lahainaʻs historic buildings, but the perspective and multiple light source are imaginary. In the real ocean you lose the whole spectrum of color when you get below thirty feet."

"So exciting was the concept in both perspective and personal style, that imitators quickly arose", says gallery owner Jim Killett. "Nelson perfected the two worlds concept, made it popular, and in the course, spawned dozens of mimics including a few who are generally interested in bringing something good to the genre. The difference, of course, is that Nelson is the only artist who didn't have to learn to paint like Robert Lyn Nelson."

References

External links
 
 Video interview with Robert Lyn Nelson at the Smithsonian Institution on the official YouTube channel of RealPopStudio
 Nelson's profile at National Marine Sanctuary Foundation.

20th-century American painters
1955 births
People from San Bernardino County, California
Living people
21st-century American painters
Artists from California